Gheorghe Iulian Dumitrașcu (born 28 November 1967) is a Romanian former footballer who played as a midfielder.

International career
Gheorghe Dumitrașcu played two friendly games at international level for Romania against Egypt.

Honours
Rapid București
Divizia B: 1989–90

Notes

References

1967 births
Living people
Romanian footballers
Romania international footballers
Association football midfielders
Liga I players
Liga II players
Nemzeti Bajnokság I players
China League One players
FCM Târgoviște players
CS Universitatea Craiova players
FC Dinamo București players
CSM Flacăra Moreni players
FC Rapid București players
ASC Oțelul Galați players
FC Sportul Studențesc București players
Győri ETO FC players
Henan Songshan Longmen F.C. players
Romanian expatriate footballers
Expatriate footballers in Hungary
Expatriate sportspeople in Hungary
Romanian expatriates in Hungary
Romanian expatriate sportspeople in Hungary
Expatriate footballers in China
Expatriate sportspeople in China
Romanian expatriates in China
Romanian expatriate sportspeople in China